Stamford ware is a type of lead-glazed earthenware, one of the earliest forms of glazed ceramics manufactured in England. It was produced in Stamford, Lincolnshire between the ninth and thirteenth centuries. It was widely traded across Britain and the near continent. The most popular forms were jugs, spouted pitchers, and small bowls. Distribution of Stamford ware has been used to map trade routes of the period.

Early Stamford glazes are essentially lead glazes, and it has been suggested they were unique among early English glazes as they contain traces of silver but not tin. The glaze was applied with a brush and can be pale yellow, orange, pale green and smoke blue. This depended on many factors including glaze composition, iron content and whether fired in reduced or oxidised conditions.

Examples can be seen at Stamford Museum and elsewhere.

Greenish Anglo-Saxon pottery discovered in the town in 1950 suggests lead glaze was in use in early times. A medieval kiln was found during work at Stamford School in 1963, and a much earlier one in Stamford Castle in 1976.

Various modern potters have produced work inspired by Stamford ware, including Joba in Stamford in the 1970s. No potter is currently making salt glaze work in the area.

See also
Surrey whiteware
Border ware
Humber ware
List of English medieval pottery

References

Ceramics of medieval England
Medieval sites in England
Anglo-Saxon archaeology
England in the High Middle Ages
Stamford, Lincolnshire